Barlindåsen is a mountain of Akershus, Norway.

References

Mountains of Viken